The 1932–33 Kentucky Wildcats men's basketball team represented the University of Kentucky in intercollegiate basketball during the 1932–33 season. The team finished the season with a 21–3 record and were named national champions by the Helms Athletic Foundation. It would be the first of five national championships at Kentucky for head coach Adolph Rupp. Senior center–forward Forest Sale was named a consensus All-American as well as the national player of the year at the season's conclusion.

Schedule and results

|-
!colspan=12 style="background:#005DAA; color:#FFFFFF;"| Regular season

|-
!colspan=12 style="text-align: center; background:#005DAA"|SEC Tournament

Source

Leading scorers

Source

References

Kentucky Wildcats men's basketball seasons
Kentucky
NCAA Division I men's basketball tournament championship seasons
Kentucky Wildcats Men's Basketball Team
Kentucky Wildcats Men's Basketball Team